Budakalász FKC  is a Hungarian handball club from Budakalász, that played in the  Nemzeti Bajnokság I, the top level championship in Hungary.

Crest, colours, supporters

Naming history

Kit manufacturers and shirt sponsor
The following table shows in detail Budakalász FKC kit manufacturers and shirt sponsors by year:

Kits

Sports Hall information
Name: – Budakalászi Sportcsarnok
City: – Budakalász
Capacity: – 400
Address: – 2011 Budakalász, Omszk park 1. az Omszki-tó mellett

Management

Team

Current squad 

Squad for the 2022–23 season

Technical staff
 Head coach:  István Csoknyai
 Assistant coach:  Tamás Hajdu
 Goalkeeping coach:  Tímea Sugár
 Fitness Consultant:  Péter Lakatos
 Masseur:  Csaba Bendó
 Club Doctor:  Dr. Gyula Szikora

Transfers
Transfers for the 2022–23 season

Joining 
  Bence Papp (RB) from  HE-DO B. Braun Gyöngyös
  Szabolcs Tóth (CB) from  Ferencvárosi TC
  Rajmond Tóth (CB) from  QHB-Eger

Leaving 
  Péter Schmid (CB) to  HE-DO B. Braun Gyöngyös
  Ivan Perisic (RB) to ?
  József Holpert (LW) to ?
  Dominik Vrhovina (LP) on loan at  QHB-Eger
  Roland Fórizs (LB) on loan at  QHB-Eger
  Rajmond Tóth (CB) to  Frigoríficos del Morrazo

Previous squads

Top scorers

Honours

Individual awards

Domestic
Nemzeti Bajnokság I Top Scorer

Recent seasons

Seasons in Nemzeti Bajnokság I: 5
Seasons in Nemzeti Bajnokság I/B: 16

In European competition

Budakalász FKC International Cup matches:

Participations in EHF Cup: 1x

EHF ranking

Former club members

Notable former players

 Csaba Bendó
 Sándor Bohács
 József Czina
 Ákos Doros
 Dávid Fekete
 Péter Gúnya
 Máté Halász
 József Holpert
 Máté Józsa
 András Koncz
 Csaba Leimeter
 Bence Nagy
 Norbert Sutka
 Ádám Tóth
 Marko Ćeranić
 Josip Jurić-Grgić (2021–)
 Tomislav Radnić
 Matko Rotim
 Tomáš Řezníček (2017–2018)
 Roberto García Parrondo
 Ivan Perišić
 Daniel Gjorgjeski (2021–)
 Maksim Mikhalin (2021–)
 Michal Holdos
 Patrik Hruščák
 Martin Mazak
 Jakub Prokop (2020–2021)
 Emil Berggren (2017–2018)
 Alexander Semikov

Former coaches

References

External links
  
 

Hungarian handball clubs
Sport in Pest County